Judgement Rock may refer to:

 Judgement Rocks, Tasmania, Australia
 Judgement Rock (novel), 2002 novel by Joanna Murray-Smith